Ilya Avtonomovich Berezhnykh (birth date unknown – c. 1830), also known as Berezhnoy, was a Russian navigator.

In 1820, Berezhnykh took part in the northern expedition, led by Ferdinand Petrovich Wrangel. He explored the coastline and the islands of the Arctic Ocean, including Kotelny and Lyakhovsky Islands as an underpilot in 1826.

References 

1830 deaths
Explorers from the Russian Empire
Russian navigators
Explorers of the Arctic
Year of birth unknown